No Place is a small village near the town of Stanley in County Durham, England, east of Stanley and west of Beamish. Situated to the south of the A693, it is home to an award-winning real ale pub, the Beamish Mary Inn (dating from 1897 and originally known as the Red Robin), and lies near the Beamish Mary coal pit.  The local church is known as the "Tin Chapel".

Etymology
The origins of the village's unusual name are uncertain; however, theories include a shortening of "North Place", "Near Place" or "Nigh Place", or that the original houses of the village stood on a boundary between two parishes, neither of which would accept the village. It could also be a literary play on the word "Utopia", which comes from the Greek: οὐ ("not") and τόπος ("place") and translates as "no-place". The village originally consisted of four terraced houses, known as No Place. In 1937, residents of the terrace of houses to the north, known as Co-operative Villas, demolished these houses, but took on the name for their own village. Derwentside Council tried to change the name of the village to Co-operative Villas in 1983; however, they met with strong protests from local residents at the removal of all signs pointing to No Place.  Today the signs say both No Place and (at the request of some residents) Co-operative Villas.

No Place has been noted for its unusual place name. Other unusual place names in the North East include the village of Pity Me (probably a contraction of Pithead Mere, a nearby bog), Bearpark (from Beaurepaire, French for "beautiful retreat" – the name of a nearby Norman manor), Once Brewed and Twice Brewed.

Film references 
Sharing the village's name is No Place, an independently produced feature film made in the North East of England and shown at the Cannes Film Festival, subsequently leading to limited distribution at the Tyneside Cinema.

References

Villages in County Durham
Stanley, County Durham